NGC 1854 (also known as NGC 1855) is a young globular cluster in the northern part of the central bar structure of the Large Magellanic Cloud in the Dorado constellation.  At 200x magnification the cluster appears very bright, large and round, with dozens of very faint stars visible. NGC 1858, a nebula/star cluster object, lies to the south-east.

The cluster was first discovered by Scottish astronomer James Dunlop who observed it in 1826.

References

External links
 

Globular clusters
1854
Dorado (constellation)
Astronomical objects discovered in 1826
Large Magellanic Cloud